Elaphria chalcedonia, the chalcedony midget moth, is a moth of the family Noctuidae. It is found in North America, where it has been recorded from the eastern United States, from Maine to Florida, west to Texas and north to Wisconsin. It is also found in Jamaica, Guadeloupe, Saint Martin, Puerto Rico and Central America. It was described by Jacob Hübner in 1808.

The wingspan is 24–28 mm. The forewings consist of a mixture of white, dark grey/blackish and dull yellow or orangish. The basal and upper median areas are dull yellowish to orangish and there is a white edge along the postmedial line, as well as dark grey to blackish shading inside the antemedial line, in the lower median area and in subterminal area. The hindwings are white with dark grey shading distally or uniform brownish-grey. Adults are on wing year round in Florida and from June to September in the northern part of the range.

The larvae feed on Penstemon, Scrophularia and Mimulus species.

References

Moths described in 1808
Caradrinini